Mechowo may refer to the following places:
Mechowo, Greater Poland Voivodeship (west-central Poland)
Mechowo, Pomeranian Voivodeship (north Poland)
Mechowo, Gryfice County in West Pomeranian Voivodeship (north-west Poland)
Mechowo, Kamień County in West Pomeranian Voivodeship (north-west Poland)
Mechowo, Kołobrzeg County in West Pomeranian Voivodeship (north-west Poland)
Mechowo, Pyrzyce County in West Pomeranian Voivodeship (north-west Poland)